Joe Lee Yiu-ming (李耀明) (1956–2003) was a Hong Kong actor. He was sometimes credited as Joe Li.

Filmography
The Mummy, Aged 19 (2002)
Devil Face, Angel Heart (2002)
Love Undercover (2002) 
The Lion Roars (2002) 
Tung gui mat yau (2001) 
Runaway (2001)
Lao fu zi (2001) 
Chung chong ging chaat (2001) (as Joe Li) 
Sui jeuk fun ji (2001) (as Joe Li) 
Faat gwong sek tau (2000) 
Gau geung ying ging (2000)
Jue lai yip yue leung saan ang
Victim (1999) 
Baau lit ying ging (1999)
Ban siu haai (1999)
Dut gwat lung yue chin nin chung (1999)

External links
 
 HK cinemagic entry
 lovehkfilm entry

Hong Kong male actors
1956 births
2003 deaths